This is a list of the members of the Australian House of Representatives in the 14th Australian Parliament, which was elected at the 1934 election on 15 September 1934. The incumbent United Australia Party led by Prime Minister of Australia Joseph Lyons with coalition partner the Country Party led by Earle Page defeated the opposition Australian Labor Party led by James Scullin.  Labor's share of the primary vote fell to an even lower number than in the 1931 election due to the |  ||  split, but it was able to pick up an extra four seats on preferences and therefore improve on its position.

Notes

References

Members of Australian parliaments by term
20th-century Australian politicians